St. Peter's Cathedral is the Roman Catholic cathedral at 315 Wyoming Avenue in Scranton, Pennsylvania, and is the mother church of the Roman Catholic Diocese of Scranton.  The entire St. Peter's Cathedral Complex is listed on the U.S. National Register of Historic Places.

Description
The church was built in 1867, as the parish church of St. Vincent de Paul. In 1883-4, a project was undertaken to remodel and embellish the church, which by now was the central church of the diocese, and on September 28, 1884, the new mother church of the diocese was consecrated by Archbishop P. J. Ryan of Philadelphia, and its name changed to the Cathedral of St. Peter, marking its new role in the still-young diocese.  The cathedral complex includes the adjacent rectory (1908) and convent.

The original windows of the church contained simple red and white diamond-shaped panes. The stained glass windows now found in the cathedral date from the alterations begun in 1883. Much of this work can be attributed to the architect Edwin Forrest Durang and later to the German designer Frank Mayer. In addition to the use of stained glass in the clerestory and over the entrances, there are 15 grandiose windows focusing on the life of Christ and highlighting the Virgin Mary and other saints. Of special note are the windows depicting the Annunciation, the Visitation, the Nativity, and the Last Supper.

The complex was listed on the National Register of Historic Places in 1976.

The present organ was built in 1979 by Casavant Frères of Quebec, Canada, the firm's Opus 3414.

In February 2008, the cathedral was chosen by EWTN's Cathedrals Across America series to host the globally televised Mass for the Feast of the Chair of St. Peter.

Cathedral staff

 The Most Reverend Joseph C. Bambera, Bishop of Scranton
 Monsignor Dale R. Rupert, Pastor 
 The Reverend Thomas M. Muldowney, V.G., Vicar General 
 Deacon Edward R. Shoener, Permanent Deacon 
 The Reverend Jeffrey J. Walsh, Episcopal Vicar for Clergy 
 Kathy Geiger, Business Manager
 Marlene Lucchi, Secretary 
 Linda Phillips Orseck director of liturgical music
 Paul Casparo, Sacristan

See also
List of Catholic cathedrals in the United States
List of cathedrals in the United States

References

External links 

 Official Cathedral Site
 Roman Catholic Diocese of Scranton Official Site

Roman Catholic churches completed in 1867
19th-century Roman Catholic church buildings in the United States
Peter, Scranton
Roman Catholic Diocese of Scranton
Churches on the National Register of Historic Places in Pennsylvania
Churches in Scranton, Pennsylvania
Tourist attractions in Scranton, Pennsylvania
National Register of Historic Places in Lackawanna County, Pennsylvania